The 2008 Minnesota Republican presidential caucuses took place on February 5, 2008, with 38 national delegates at stake. The caucuses were considered a non-binding straw poll, since Minnesota officially chose 24 delegates to the 2008 Republican National Convention during district conventions from May 3 to May 24, 2008, and the remaining 14 delegates during the state convention on June 7, 2008.  Those delegates to the national convention officially nominated the President.  Mitt Romney was the winner of the Minnesota caucuses.

The 2008 Republican National Convention was held in St. Paul, Minnesota from September 1 until September 4, 2008.

Results

See also
 2008 Minnesota Democratic presidential caucuses
 2008 Republican Party presidential primaries

References

Minnesota
2008 Minnesota elections
2008
2008 Super Tuesday